Flavio Calzavara (21 February 1900 – 10 March 1981) was an Italian film director and screenwriter. He directed 21 films between 1939 and 1956.

Filmography

 Canzone proibita (1956)
 Gli occhi senza luce (1956)
 Napoli piange e ride (1954)
 Rigoletto e la sua tragedia (1954)
 El curioso impertinente (1953)
 Dieci canzoni d'amore da salvare (1953)
 La pattuglia dell'Amba Alagi (1953)
 I due derelitti (1951) Adaptation of the novel by Pierre Decourcelle
 Contro la legge (1950)
 Red Seal (1950)
 Peccatori (1945)
 Resurrection (1944)
 Calafuria (1943)
 Dagli Appennini alle Ande (1943)
 Carmela (1942)
 The Countess of Castiglione (1942)
 Confessione (1941)
 Don Buonaparte (1941)
 Il signore a doppio petto (1941)
 Il ladro sono io (1940)
 Piccoli naufraghi (1939)

References

External links

1900 births
1981 deaths
Italian film directors
20th-century Italian screenwriters
Italian male screenwriters
20th-century Italian male writers